Lars Johannesen Aga (1800–1889) was a Norwegian politician.

He was elected to the Norwegian Parliament in 1842 and 1845, representing the rural constituency of Søndre Bergenhus Amt (today named Hordaland). He worked as a farmer and bailiff.

References

1800 births
1889 deaths
Members of the Storting
Hordaland politicians